Bill Armistead (born May 29, 1944) is an American politician from the state of Alabama. He served as the chairman of the Alabama Republican Party from 2011 to 2015. He served in the Alabama Senate from 1995 to 2003.

Early life and education
Bill Armistead was born on May 29, 1944, in Campbell, Alabama. He attended Samford University, where he graduated with a bachelor's degree in business administration in 1966. While at Samford, Armistead founded the Samford chapter of the College Republicans.

Career
Armistead worked for trucking companies for 20 years before becoming a staffer for H. Guy Hunt, the Governor of Alabama. He worked for Hunt from 1988 through 1993 as his chief economic advisor. He was elected to the Alabama Senate in 1994, and was reelected in 1998. In 2002, Armistead ran for Lieutenant Governor of Alabama. He lost the election to Democrat Lucy Baxley.

In 2011, Armistead was elected chairman of the Alabama Republican Party. He stepped down in 2015, when Terry Lathan was elected.

Armistead worked on both the 2010 and 2022 gubernatorial campaigns of businessman Tim James. In 2010, Armistead was a Birmingham regional director for James' campaign, but after James lost a spot in the runoff for the primary, Armistead began working for future Governor Robert J. Bentley's campaign instead. Armistead currently serves as campaign chairman for James' 2022 gubernatorial run.

Personal life
Armistead resides in Vestavia Hills, Alabama. He was married to Emily Armistead from April 1968 until her death in a traffic accident in March 2017.

References

External links
Our Campaigns – Bill Armistead (AL) profile

|-

Living people
1944 births
Samford University alumni
State political party chairs of Alabama
Republican Party Alabama state senators
People from Clarke County, Alabama
People from Columbiana, Alabama